Colin Richardson is a British record producer, mixer and recording engineer. He has worked on over 100 albums and is most frequently associated with heavy metal and its subgenres.

Career
Some of the bands he has worked for include:

3 Inches of Blood
Anathema
Anonymus
As I Lay Dying
Behemoth
Bolt Thrower
Bullet for My Valentine
Cannibal Corpse
Carcass
The Chameleons
The Change
Chimaira
Cradle of Filth
Crash
Crash
CRUSHER france
DÅÅTH
Dearly Beheaded
DevilDriver
Disincarnate
Eluveitie
Fear Factory
Fightstar
Five Pointe O
Funeral for a Friend
GBH
Godflesh
God Forbid
Gorefest
Gorguts
Hamlet
Heaven Shall Burn
InMe
Kataklysm
Kreator
Liberty 37
Machine Head
Massacre
Mass Hysteria
Mercyless
Membranes
Murderdolls
Napalm Death
One Minute Silence
Overkill
Rise to Remain
Roadrunner United
Rodrigo y Gabriela
Sanctity
Sepultura
SikTh
Sinister
Slipknot
S.O.B.
SugarComa
Sydonia
The Exploited
Those Damn Crows
Tarja Turunen
Trivium
Uncle Meat
Wednesday 13
While She Sleeps

References

External links
Colin Richardson Myspace page
INTERVIEW: Metal production guru Colin Richardson (musicradar.com)

Living people
Year of birth missing (living people)
British record producers
British audio engineers